A "welfare queen" is a derogatory term used in the United States to refer to women who allegedly misuse or collect excessive welfare payments through fraud, child endangerment, or manipulation. Reporting on welfare fraud began during the early 1960s, appearing in general-interest magazines such as Reader's Digest. The term originates from media reporting in 1974, and was popularized by Ronald Reagan, beginning with his 1976 presidential campaign.

Since then, the phrase "welfare queen" has remained a stigmatizing label and is sometimes directed toward black, single mothers. Hence, it is considered racist by many.
Although women in the U.S. could no longer stay on welfare indefinitely after the federal government launched the Temporary Assistance for Needy Families (TANF) program in 1996, the term remains a trope in the American dialogue on poverty and negatively shapes welfare policies and outcomes for these families.

Origin
The idea of welfare fraud goes back to the early-1960s, when the majority of known offenders were male. Despite this, many journalistic exposés were published at the time on those who would come to be known as welfare queens. Reader's Digest and Look magazine published sensational stories about mothers gaming the system.

The term was coined in 1974, either by George Bliss of the Chicago Tribune in his articles about Linda Taylor, or by Jet magazine. Neither publication credits the other in their "Welfare Queen" stories of that year. Taylor was ultimately charged with committing $8,000 in fraud and having four aliases. She was convicted in 1977 of illegally obtaining 23 welfare checks using two aliases and was sentenced to two to six years in prison. During the same decade, Taylor was investigated for alleged kidnapping and baby trafficking, and is suspected of multiple murders, but was never charged.

Accounts of her activities were used by Ronald Reagan, beginning with his 1976 presidential campaign, although he never identified her by name or race.

Used to illustrate his criticisms of social programs in the United States, Reagan employed the trope of the "Welfare Queen" in order to rally support for reform of the welfare system. During his initial bid for the Republican nomination in 1976, and again in 1980, Reagan constantly made reference to the "Welfare Queen" at his campaign rallies. Some of these stories, and some that followed into the 1990s, focused on female welfare recipients engaged in behavior counter-productive to eventual financial independence such as having children out of wedlock, using AFDC money to buy drugs, or showing little desire to work. Reagan's characterization of these women were used to justify real-life changes to policies and play a role in the shrinking of the social safety net. These women were understood to be social parasites, draining society of valuable resources while engaging in self damaging behavior. They were also understood to be overwhelmingly women of color in an effort to push racialized narratives. Despite these early appearances of the "Welfare Queen" icon, stories about able-bodied men collecting welfare continued to dominate discourse until the 1970s, at which point women became the main focus of welfare fraud stories.

In political discourse

Prior to former President Ronald Reagan's campaign, in the 1960s, the Moynihan Report was created. This report addressed the ways that Black people experienced poverty and tried to cite a cause of the inequality in income this group faced. Moynihan's central argument of the report was that the "breakdown" of the Black family was the cause of poverty among Black Americans. This argument had two key points, which were Black children growing up without a father, and in matriarchal systems, was damaging which contributes to deviancy in children. The report changed the thought process surrounding welfare, specifically concerning welfare laws and policy and the "solution" to poverty. Politicians began to place blame on gender and cultural differences between Black and white people rather than welfare laws. While feminists and other activists fought against the ideas birthed from this report, the believe of a fracturing Black family began to take hold and influence policy.

The term "welfare queen" became a catchphrase during political dialogue of the 1980s and 1990s. The term came under criticism for its supposed use as a political tool and for its derogatory connotations. Criticism focused on the fact that individuals committing welfare fraud were, in reality, a very small percentage of those legitimately receiving welfare. Use of the term was also seen as an attempt to stereotype recipients in order to undermine public support for AFDC.

The welfare queen idea became an integral part of a larger discourse on welfare reform, especially during the bipartisan effort to reform the welfare system under Bill Clinton. Anti-welfare advocates ended AFDC in 1996 and overhauled the system with the introduction of TANF with the belief that welfare discouraged self-reliance. Despite the new system's time-limits, the welfare queen legacy has endured and continues to shape public perception and policy. The current TANF policies restrict welfare support in ways that appear to align with and may be the result of the fears and concerns centered around the welfare queen trope. For example, welfare payments are intended for temporary support (a maximum of five years) and restrict welfare support through work requirements and family caps to avoid the fear of "welfare queens" and other "undeserving" recipients from taking advantage of welfare benefits or from an overly generous welfare system encouraging financial and moral irresponsibility.

Despite the fact that the majority of welfare recipients are white, welfare attitudes are primarily shaped by public perceptions of black people on welfare, which perpetuates racial tropes such as the "welfare queen" and blocks access to resources that are needed by these families.

During Governor Mitt Romney's 2012 campaign, he alluded to the "welfare queen" stereotype again when he attacked President Barack Obama by spreading television advertisements vilifying President Obama's leniency on the "undeserving" poor through reducing the rigor of TANF requirements to primarily appeal to a white, middle class demographic who believe in cutting government spending on welfare programs to force people in poverty out of perceived laziness and into self-reliance.

Gender and racial stereotypes
Political scientist Franklin Gilliam has argued that the welfare queen stereotype has roots in both race and gender:

The trope of the welfare queen may be analyzed from the framework of intersectionality to better understand how race, class, gender, and other identities shape individuals' and groups' privileges and disadvantages.

The media's image of poverty shifted from focusing on the plight of white Appalachian farmers and on the factory closings in the 1960s to a more racially divisive and negative image of poor blacks in urban areas. All of this, according to political scientist Martin Gilens, led to the American public dramatically overestimating the percentage of African-Americans in poverty. By 1973, in magazine pictures depicting welfare recipients, 75% featured African Americans even though African Americans made up only 35% of welfare recipients and only 12.8% of the US population.   In 2016, African Americans made up 39.6% of welfare recipients, and, in 2015, African Americans made up 13.3% of the United States population. According to the United States Census, "In 2019, the share of Blacks in poverty was 1.8 times greater than their share among the general population. Blacks represented 13.2% of the total population in the United States, but 23.8% of the poverty population." Van Doorn states that the media repeatedly shows a relationship between lazy, black, and poor suggesting why some Americans are opposed to welfare programs.

From the 1970s onward, women became the predominant face of poverty. In a 1999 study by Franklin Gilliam that examined people's attitudes on race, gender, and the media, an eleven-minute news clip featuring one of two stories on welfare was shown to two groups of participants. Each story on welfare had a different recipient—one was a white woman and the other was a black woman. The results showed that people were extremely accurate in their recall of the race and gender of the black female welfare recipient in comparison to those who saw the story with the white female welfare recipient. This outcome confirmed that this unbalanced narrative of gender and race had become a standard cultural bias and that Americans often made implicit associations between race, gender, and poverty.

Furthermore, research conducted by Jennifer L. Monahan, Irene Shtrulis, and Sonja Givens on the transference of media images into interpersonal contexts reveal similar results. The researchers found that "Specific stereotype portrayals of African American women were hypothesized to produce stereotype-consistent judgments made of a different African American woman"

Additionally, some believe that black single women on welfare are irresponsible in their reproductive decisions and may continue to have children to reap welfare benefits. However, as analyzed from the United States General Accounting office data, there is no greater likelihood of these occurrences with women on welfare.

The "welfare queen" stereotype is driven by the false and racist beliefs that places the blame of the circumstances of poor black single mothers as the result of their own individual issues, bringing forward racial tropes such as their promiscuity, lack of structure and morals, and avoidance of work. With primary narratives regarding poverty being driven by the myth of the meritocracy, or in other words, of the ideologies that are centered in self-reliance and hard work being enough to pull oneself out of poverty, the "welfare queen" trope illustrates the result of adding racial and gender dimensions to these inaccurate claims. This became a public identity mapped onto black women's bodies and the perpetuation of this public identity has been used to inform welfare policy outcomes. In addition to work ethic, family values, such as a heteronormative, working, two-parent household and having children only when married, are seen as the cultural standard. As a result, deviations from this ideal constitute a lower social value. By stereotyping single black mothers as "welfare queens," the interpersonal, structural, and institutional barriers that prevent adequate resources and opportunities for them which lead to or reinforce poverty are not addressed. The lack of accountability seen by institutions and structures within our government promotes individualistic and neoliberal ideals that put one's societal failures onto themselves rather than analyzing institutional barriers that might be preventing any necessary changes within the U.S. welfare system.

Impact of the stereotype
In the 1990s, partly due to widespread belief in the "welfare queen" stereotype, twenty-two American states passed laws that banned increasing welfare payments to mothers after they had more children. In order to receive additional funds after the birth of a child, women were required to prove to the state that their pregnancies were the result of contraceptive failure, rape, or incest. Between 2002 and 2016, these laws were repealed in seven states. California State Senator Holly Mitchell said at the time of the repeal of California's law, "I don't know a woman—and I don't think she exists—who would have a baby for the sole purpose of having another $130 a month."

The "welfare queen" stereotype also affects the attitudes and policies of the welfare system on poor black single mothers. Champlin argues that the current welfare system punishes poor single mothers by not providing adequate access to contraceptives or abortions, if a woman does not wish to get pregnant, or having family caps that limit welfare benefits for women with children. It seems that regardless of whether a woman chooses to have children or not, her capabilities in achieving those desires are severely restricted by the policies and attitudes of the welfare system, which places the blame of poverty on the women and reinforces the cycle of poverty. Welfare benefits have been used as a tool for reproductive oppression and prevent their autonomy over their bodies. The reproductive oppression is partially rooted in the beliefs that having children outside of a marriage results the reliance on welfare and additional children that will continue the culture of poverty. These limitations in black single mothers' reproductive rights as requirements for welfare follows a theme of the social control of the poor, specifically where the reproduction of "fit" or "unfit" groups are controlled by those in power who deem minoritized groups, who do not follow a white, heteronormative ideal, as substandard and less fit to have reproductive autonomy.

This racial trope causes feelings of resentment against black families by portraying single parent families or non-normative households as those who unfairly take advantage of the welfare system, which leads to policies and practices that result in the inadequate provision of resources to the families. Consequently, these families are stuck in a state of poverty and are further stigmatized. The reduction of their welfare safety net is rooted in the racially-based vilification of the mothers and further harms the children of these families as a result, despite the original intentions of welfare policies being to assist the children.

As stated by the United States Department of Health and Human Services website, the goals of TANF (Temporary Assistance to Needy Families) program include reducing "out-of wedlock pregnancies" and encouraging "two-parent families" and self-reliance. The stereotype of the welfare queen appears to run counter to these ideals: the portrayal of a single, unemployed woman with a lack of procreative and financial responsibility and an overreliance on government benefits. As a result, some authors argue that current welfare policies are shaped by the desire to punish these "undeserving" recipients, rather than welfare's goal of supporting the wellbeing of mothers and their children. Additionally, the trope of the welfare queen also shaped other policies such as the Personal Responsibility and Work Act of 1996 by enforcing patriarchal, heteronormative ideals as the moral gold standard for tackling poverty and the "culture" of poverty and by situating black single mothers as "deviants" from the ideal mothering figure.

The stereotype of the welfare queen, along with other black tropes such as the "Jezebel", "Mammies, and "matriarchs," are reflected in the attitudes of welfare care workers, positioning of welfare clients, and the talks between them.  Overall, these tropes result in negative interactions between the welfare recipients and the caseworkers. For example, some caseworkers viewed the mothers as sexually irresponsible, negligent, or entitled, leading some to talk to mothers attempting to seek welfare in a degrading or patronizing way.

Some scholars argue against the welfare requirement of having single mothers work by posing the question of why there is a greater focus on ensuring that single mothers contribute to the workforce rather than them having the time and resources to support and care for their children. Roberts and others point to one of the reasons being the devaluation of maternal work, particularly surrounding black single mothers. They explain that, due to society's perception of black single mothers as "unfit" for mothering or as deviations from the ideal maternal figure in a 2-parent, heteronormative family structure, the importance of black mothering is often neglected and undervalued, resulting in separating black mothers from their children in requiring them to participate in the workforce. This reflects similar themes from slavery, where enslaved mothers were often forced to be apart from their children in order to serve their enslavers' labor needs. Additionally, in requiring mothers to work, discussions about their children and their wellbeing are lost from the focus of these conversations. Instead, they are positioned as not a priority, as compared to the productivity required from their mothers, and their wellbeing is at the expense of these work requirements for their caregivers. Roberts argues that this implies that society does not place value in the children of mothers on welfare and the potential for their growth and development. Rather, these children are seen as already lost in what society deems valuable. They are not viewed as being worthwhile to be invested in and that they will likely to grow up and perpetuate the same moral "deviance" and culture of poverty as their mothers.

Movements for welfare reform and destigmatization
In the 1960s, black and female led movements for adequate welfare benefits and a resistance against negative stereotypes started to be seen throughout the United States in local and community contexts. By organizing political demonstrations, creating welfare resource guides, advocating against restrictive welfare requirements (such as a disqualification for welfare benefits if there was an adult male figure in the household), and challenging the idea of a heteronormative, two-parent family structure being the gold standard for a functional and self-reliant household, these women (who referred to themselves as mothers to highlight the value of their labor at home) aimed to provide greater autonomy and reduce stigmatization for mother welfare-recipients. They also argued against the control of female reproduction through welfare, that all women should have the choice whether or not to use birth control and that welfare support should not be contingent on how "deserving" the mothers were based on their choices.

Some authors have also argued that the construction of the strong black woman image, one that portrays black mothers as resilient leaders of their household, stemmed from the desire of black women to resist and reject the welfare queen trope.

In a study that interviewed 60 middle to high-income black mothers, many of the mothers expressed ways they tried to counter the stereotype of the welfare queen that may be placed on them by others. They would emphasize their educational backgrounds, mention their husbands, and dress to signal their belonging with the other white mothers to show that they did not fit the welfare queen stereotype.

Research has shown that the ways that welfare was constructed around race and how the residual effects of this formation have affected Black women. Specifically, research as shown that people of color, specifically Black people and Hispanic people, have been overrepresented in less generous social programs. This disproportion resulted in their overpopulation in welfare. This tendency, coupled with the overrepresentation of Black people in media representation of people on welfare has helped to produce the welfare queen trope. Lastly, southern states in the 1940s enforced "suitable home" laws which allowed welfare line workers to refuse to provide aid to those who infringed on sexual norms. This rule simultaneously reinforced and promoted stereotypes about Black women and denied this group aid.

Several academics have been researching the ways that Black women experience welfare. Specifically, in the case of the Personal Responsibility Act of 1996, work first programs began to take over welfare. Work first programs impact Black women in racialized and gendered ways. These programs emphasize the need to place employment above all else in order to qualify for support. Black women are typically recommended for these programs when applying for welfare due.  This can be attributed to conscious or conscious bias by government employees who fall into the ideology about Black women being less domestic and more ready for work programs. This results in Black women being seen as less likely to succeed in education reform programs or longer-term training programs. Essentially, racialized ideas about Black women being lazy, overly sexually active, or as having a drug or alcohol addiction can influence welfare line workers to force this group into work-first programs. Studies about this overrepresentation in welfare have led to more research into the ways that welfare can be reformed to better benefit Black women.

See also
 Dog-whistle politics
 Feminization of poverty
 Le bruit et l'odeur
 Media hype
 Stereotypes of African Americans

Welfare
 Criticisms of welfare
 Supplemental Nutrition Assistance Program
 Welfare's effect on poverty
 Welfare fraud

References

Further reading
 Adair, Vivyan Campbell. From Good Ma to Welfare Queen: A genealogy of the poor woman in American literature, photography and culture (Psychology Press, 2000).
 Dow, Dawn Marie. "Negotiating 'The Welfare Queen' and 'The Strong Black Woman': African American Middle-Class Mothers' Work and Family Perspectives." Sociological Perspectives 58.1 (2015): 36–55.
 Gilman, Michele Estrin. "The Return of the Welfare Queen" The American University Journal of Gender, Social Policy & the Law 22#2 (2014) online
 Hancock, Ange-Marie. The Politics of Disgust: The Public Identity of the Welfare Queen (2004) online
 Kohler-Hausmann. Julilly. "Welfare Crises, Penal Solutions, and the Origins of the 'Welfare Queen'," Journal of Urban History, 41 (Sept. 2015), 756–71. online
Mould, Tom. Overthrowing the Queen: Telling Stories of Welfare in America (Indiana University Press, 2020)
Somers, Margaret R, and Fred Block. 2005. "From Poverty to Perversity: Ideas, Markets, and Institutions over 200 Years of Welfare Debate." American Sociological Review 70(2): 260–287.

External links
Levin, Josh. "The Welfare Queen." Slate. December 19, 2013. – article about Linda Taylor
NPR. 2019. "The Original 'Welfare Queen'" 

African-American gender relations
Stereotypes of black women
Queen
Welfare fraud
Propaganda in the United States
Ronald Reagan
Gender-related stereotypes
Slang terms for women
Stereotypes of African Americans
Queen
Class-related slurs
Pejorative terms for women
Reagan administration controversies